Courts of Missouri include:
;State courts of Missouri

Supreme Court of Missouri
Missouri Court of Appeals (3 districts)
Missouri Circuit Courts (46 circuits)

Federal courts located in Missouri
United States Court of Appeals for the Eighth Circuit (headquartered in St. Louis, having jurisdiction over the United States District Courts of Arkansas, Iowa, Minnesota, Missouri, Nebraska, North Dakota, South Dakota)
United States District Court for the Eastern District of Missouri
United States District Court for the Western District of Missouri

Former federal courts of Missouri
United States District Court for the District of Missouri (extinct, subdivided)

References

External links
Missouri Courts Website.
National Center for State Courts – directory of state court websites.
Publications by or about Missouri State Courts at Internet Archive.

Courts in the United States